The A33 autoroute is a  long motorway in northeastern France. It forms part of European route E23.

Route
After Lunéville the road becomes the N333 to Blâmont. The road forms an upgrade of the N4 which is now called the N4a.

Junctions

References

External links

A33 autoroute in Saratlas

Autoroutes in France